The Ford Puma is a subcompact crossover SUV (B-segment) marketed by Ford since 2019. It is considered an SUV equivalent of the seventh-generation Fiesta. The vehicle is only available for the European and Australasian markets, with sales starting in Europe from 2019 and sales in Australasia from late 2020. In the European market, the Puma is positioned above the EcoSport and below the Kuga (also called Escape outside Europe).

An electric version of the Puma will be launched in 2024.

Overview
Ford first announced the Puma crossover at its event Go Further in Amsterdam, along with the introduction of the third-generation Kuga. The Puma nameplate was last used on the Puma sport compact. The vehicle is based on the seventh-generation Fiesta platform (Ford Global B-car platform).

Production of the Puma started in Craiova, Romania (Ford Romania) in October 2019 along with the EcoSport subcompact crossover and the EcoBoost 1.0 L Fox engine used in both cars. Ford invested two hundred million euros, and employed 1,700 people on the project. 

The Puma is offered with a mild hybrid 1.0 litre EcoBoost three cylinder turbo gasoline engine with a belt driven integrated starter, which uses energy from the braking system to charge the forty eight volt lithium ion battery pack in order to increase torque and lower emissions.

In December 2022, the Puma Vivid Ruby Edition was unveiled as the new flagship trim.

In March 2023, the Puma ST Powershift was officially launched with a  1.0L mild-hybrid engine and an automatic transmission.

Safety features 
Puma was tested by Euro NCAP in 2019. 
It is rated five-star.
Adult and child protection is rated at 94% and 84%. Pedestrian safety is rated 77% by Euro NCAP.

Pre-Collision Assist with Pedestrian Detection, Emergency Brake Assist, Tire Pressure Monitoring System, Electronic Stability Control, semi-autonomous parking assist, and Emergency Steering Assist.

The car also has adaptive cruise control.

Other available features are autonomous emergency braking, Intelligent Speed Limiter and lane keeping assist.

Awards 
In January 2020, What Car? magazine awarded the Puma its Car of the Year title.

In January 2021, the Puma 1.0 Ecoboost Hybrid 155 Titanium won What Car?'s Small SUV of the Year title. The same year, the Puma ST 1.5 Ecoboost 200 Performance Pack was named the magazine's Sports SUV of the Year. What Car? awarded the Puma five stars out of five in its review of the car.

Motorsport
A Group Rally1 car, named Ford Puma Rally1, is set to compete the 2022 World Rally Championship.

Sales 
In 2021, the Ford Puma became the best-selling Ford model in the UK, surpassing the Ford Fiesta. Its high sales figures also resulted in it being the overall 8th best-selling car in the UK in 2021 having achieved 28,697 new registrations throughout the year.

References

External links

  

Puma (crossover)
Cars introduced in 2019
2020s cars
Mini sport utility vehicles
Crossover sport utility vehicles
Euro NCAP superminis
Front-wheel-drive vehicles
Hybrid electric cars